Bangawan is a census town in Shahdol district in the state of Madhya Pradesh, India.

Demographics
As of a 2001 India census, Bangawan had a population of 20,719. Males constitute 53% of the population and females 47%. Bangawan has an average literacy rate of 63%, higher than the national average of 59.5%; with 61% of the males and 39% of females literate. 14% of the population is under 6 years of age.

References

Cities and towns in Shahdol district
Shahdol